The Protecting Canadians from Online Crime Act (S.C. 2014, c. 31) was introduced by the Conservative government of Stephen Harper on November 20, 2013, during the 41st Parliament, and received royal assent on December 9, 2014.

Commonly known as "lawful access" legislation, the Act is the fifth iteration of a framework that empowers Canadian law enforcement and security intelligence agencies and the product of four previous attempts made by both Liberal and Conservative governments.

Objective
The Act was intended to address the problem of cyberbullying, which had received a high profile from the cases involving the deaths of Rehtaeh Parsons and Amanda Todd. It incorporated recommendations concerning cyberbullying and the distribution of intimate images that were made in 2013 to federal, provincial and territorial ministers responsible for public safety. It also serves to implement obligations arising from Canada's accession to the Convention on Cybercrime in 2001.

Controversy 
Critics have argued Bill C-13 capitalized on the recent deaths of Rehtaeh Parsons and Amanda Todd. MP Claude Gravelle noted in House of Commons debates: "the Conservatives decided to include things that have nothing to do with cyberbullying. For example, there is a subclause on terrorists and something else on people who steal cable television signals, which has absolutely nothing to do with cyberbullying". Senator Mobina Jaffer argued in debates of the Senate, "Amanda Todd's and Rehtaeh Parsons' lives would have been no different if this bill had been enacted earlier".

This legislation makes it illegal to distribute images of a person in any way without their consent. It is said this could also violate people's privacy by giving authorities more power to watch what they are doing online. Police now only need "reasonable grounds for suspicion" to get a warrant. These warrants can now include allowing police to access online data, phone records and digital tracking. "The bill also grants immunity to telecoms that voluntarily hand over data, a sticking point raising privacy concerns." "Critics have warned the bill's thresholds for warrants are too low and that the cyber bullying law is too broad and vague."

Legislative history 
This bill was proposed four times previously, making Bill C-13 the fifth iteration of "Lawful Access" proposals introduced into Canadian Parliament. Liberal and Conservative governments have each attempted to introduce lawful access.

First attempt: Bill C-74 (2005)
Lawful access was first proposed under Bill C-74 (short titled the Modernization of Investigative Techniques Act) by Former Liberal Prime Minister Paul Martin on November 15, 2005, but did not advance past its first reading in the House of Commons as his Parliament was dissolved on November 28, 2005.

Second attempt: Bill C-46 and Bill C-47 (2009)
On June 18, 2009, Stephen Harper's Conservative government proposed two lawful access frameworks, Bill C-46 (short titled Investigative Powers for the 21st Century Act) and Bill C-47 (short titled Technical Assistance for Law Enforcement in the 21st Century Act). These two policy proposals failed to advance beyond the House of Commons, as Stephen Harper prorogued Parliament on December 30, 2009, which was the second time within less 400 days (the first being on December 4, 2008).

Third attempt: Bill C-50, Bill C-51 and Bill C-52 (2010)
Following the Conservatives' first failed attempt to introduce lawful access, Stephen Harper's government introduced three bills concurrently at the end of 2010: Bill C-50 (short titled Improving Access to Investigative Tools for Serious Crimes Act), Bill C-51 (short titled Investigative Powers for the 21st Century Act) and Bill C-52 (short titled Investigating and Preventing Criminal Electronic Communications Act). These three policy proposals failed to advance as the Conservatives were defeated by a motion of non-confidence vote on March 25, 2011. This resulted in a federal election held later that year on May 2, 2011, which resulted in a Conservative majority government.

Fourth attempt: Bill C-30 (2012)
After the Conservatives' second failed attempt, Harper's Conservatives introduced Bill C-30 (short titled the Protecting Children from Internet Predators Act) on February 14, 2012. Bill C-30 was originally titled "Lawful Access Act" and tabled by Former Public Safety Minister, Vic Toews, but was withdrawn from the House of Commons and resubmitted one hour later under the new title, "Protecting Children from Internet Predators Act", despite that "the bill actually made no reference to child predators except in its title". If passed, Bill C-30 would have granted law enforcement and security intelligence agencies with expanded surveillance powers, mandated internet service providers (ISPs) to disclose Canadian subscriber information (such as metadata) without a warrant and compelled ISPs to reveal information transmitted over their networks without a warrant or judicial oversight. When criticized by Members of Parliament about privacy concerns and civil liberty issues, Vic Toews responded that Canadians "can either stand with us or with the child pornographers" on February 13, 2012. The next day, on February 14, 2012, Vic Toews appeared on national television on CTV News and denied that he ever made these comments, calling it "a far crime from that". In protest against Toews, the hacktivist collective Anonymous targeted him, revealing that he was having an affair, to highlight the dangers of anyone having warrantless access to Canadians' digital lives. The hacktivist collective declared, "Anonymous will not allow a politician who allows his citizens no secrets to have any secrets of his own" on a video uploaded to YouTube. Bill C-30 was ultimately abandoned and Former Conservative Justice Minister, Rob Nicholson, promised Canadians that future attempts to introduce lawful access "will not contain the measures contained in C-30" on February 11, 2013.

Despite this declaration, the Conservatives introduced Bill C-13 on November 20, 2013, which was the fifth iteration for the bill.

Further reading
 
 Tomblin, Jordon (2015). The Rehearsal and Performance of Lawful Access. M.A. Thesis, Carleton University.

References

2014 in Canadian law
Canadian federal legislation
Surveillance
Cyberbullying
Cybercrime